John Francis Lawlor (14 March 1934 – 20 May 2018) was an Irish Olympic athlete in track and field. He attended St. Joseph's Secondary C.B.S. in Fairview. In 1964 he failed to qualify for the finals, finishing 23rd in the qualifying round.

While a student at Boston University, he won the NCAA Championships in the hammer throw in 1959 and 1960, setting meet records both times (207-5/63.22 in 1959 and 209-2/63.76 in 1960).

References
Official Olympic Reports
International Olympic Committee results database
John Lawlor's obituary
 

1934 births
2018 deaths
Athletes from the Republic of Ireland
Olympic athletes of Ireland
Athletes (track and field) at the 1960 Summer Olympics
Athletes (track and field) at the 1964 Summer Olympics
Irish male hammer throwers
Universiade medalists in athletics (track and field)
Universiade bronze medalists for Ireland
Medalists at the 1961 Summer Universiade
People educated at St. Joseph's CBS, Fairview